DKSH, also known as DiethelmKellerSiberHegner, is a Swiss holding company specialising in market expansion services, e.g. outsourcing. Although its headquarters is in Zurich, DKSH is deeply rooted in communities all across the Asia Pacific region.

The company offers any combination of sourcing, marketing, sales, distribution and after-sales-services and is organized into four Business Units: Consumer Goods (including the Business Segment Luxury & Lifestyle), Healthcare, Performance Materials and Technology. Its core business is supporting other companies to grow their business in new or existing markets.

With 850 business locations in 36 countries and 33,350 specialized staff, it is one of the top 30 Swiss companies ranked by sales and employees. In 2019, DKSH generated annual net sales of CHF 11.6 billion.

Organizational background
The company has its origin in the activities of three Swiss entrepreneurs who sailed east to Asia in the 1860s. Independently and within a few years of each other, Hermann Siber set off for the Japanese port of Yokohama, Wilhelm Heinrich Diethelm for Singapore and Eduard Anton Keller for the Philippines.

As the oldest of the original companies, 'Siber & Brennwald' was founded in Yokohama in 1865.

'Siber & Brennwald' was one of the first European companies to be established in Japan, just a few months after the establishment of the "Treaty of Amity and Trade" between the two nations on February 6 of 1864. 

In 1868, Eduard Anton Keller joined  C. Lutz & Co., which was founded in Manila in 1866, and renamed this existing enterprise Ed. A. Keller & Co. after he acquired it a year later in 1887.

In a similar manner, in 1871 Wilhelm Heinrich Diethelm joined Hooglandt & Co., established in 1860 in Singapore. Sixteen years later, in 1887, he acquired this company and renamed it as Diethelm & Co. Ltd.

The three ancestral companies expanded their business primarily in Asia. Although the European market played a subsidiary role, each headquarters was situated in Switzerland, which illustrates the intensive contact to the home country.

Established in 1906 on the banks of Chao Phraya River, today the company is one of Thailand's leading business organizations, with annual sales of THB 123 billion in 2019. DKSH Thailand has close to 12,000 employees and a comprehensive network of branches across Thailand. It generates more than a third of overall revenues for DKSH.

In 1931 Diethelm & Co., Ltd. was granted permission by Royal Warrant to display the royal Garuda emblem, the official seal of the Royal Household of Thailand.

Even though the two families Diethelm and Keller always had a close-knit business and private relationship, the two companies finally merged during the 2000 summer into Diethelm Keller Holding. Two years later, in 2002, Siber Hegner joined as well and this resulted in establishing DKSH. DKSH went public in March 2012 on the SIX Swiss Exchange.

In 2015, the company celebrated its 150th anniversary.

In March 2017 Stefan P. Butz became DKSH's new CEO, with former CEO, Dr. Joerg Wolle, replacing Adrian T. Keller as Chairman of the Board of Directors.

In October 2017, DKSH acquired 60 percent of shares in PT Wicaksana which provided the basis for DKSH’s market entry in Indonesia for Business Units Consumer Goods and Healthcare. Media Release DKSH, October 30, 2017 

In October 2018, DKSH announced that in March 2019 Wolle would be resigning his position as Chairman after just two years. Adrian T. Keller became Chairman instead of Wolle.

In order to strengthen the Consumer Goods Business Unit, the corresponding business of Auric Pacific in Malaysia and Singapore was acquired for CHF 160 million on 1 April 2019. Revenue of the acquired business is approx. CHF 185 million. This represents the most important acquisition by DKSH since 2002.

With several acquisitions in Australia and New Zealand between 2018 and 2020, DKSH has strengthened both the services' portfolio and its geographical market coverage in the Pacific region. Amongst others, DKSH acquired Davies Foods, consumer goods distributor CTD, field marketing provider Crossmark, and speciality chemicals distributor Axieo.

In May 2020, Marco Gadola has been elected as the new Chairman of the DKSH Board of Directors, succeeding Adrian T. Keller.

DKSH Vietnam Co.,Ltd.: No.23 Doc Lap Avenue, Vietnam-Singapore Industrial Park, Binh Hoa Ward, Thuan An City, Binh Duong Province, Vietnam

References

External links
International DKSH websites

DKSH divisions

Official DKSH social media accounts
 DKSH Linkedin page
 DKSH Corporate Facebook page
 DKSH Careers Facebook page
 DKSH Twitter profile
 DKSH Youtube channel

Service companies of Switzerland
Holding companies of Switzerland
Thai Royal Warrant holders
Companies listed on the SIX Swiss Exchange